Lisa Dyson is an American scientist, physicist, and entrepreneur. She is the founder and CEO of Kiverdi, a biotechnology company that uses carbon transformation technologies to develop sustainable products for commercial applications, including agriculture, plastics, and biodegradable materials. She is also the founder and CEO of Air Protein, a spin-off company from Kiverdi, which seeks to produce sustainable meat alternatives from elements found in air.

She earned a PhD in theoretical high energy physics from the Massachusetts Institute of Technology (MIT) in 2004. She is a TED speaker in residence and was the fourth Black woman (and one of only six) to earn a PhD in theoretical high energy, nuclear, or quantum gravity physics.

Early life and education 
Dyson grew up in Southern California and completed degrees in physics and mathematics at Brandeis University in 1997. After meeting several physics professors at Brandeis, she became more interested in pursuing physics research. She was a Fulbright Scholar at Imperial College London, where she studied quantum field theory and earned a Masters of Science degree in physics. 

Dyson earned her PhD at the MIT Center for Theoretical Physics at the Massachusetts Institute of Technology (MIT) in 2004, working with Leonard Susskind on quantum gravity, general relativity, and string theory. She also worked with Susskind and Matthew Kleban on the Boltzmann Brain problem, publishing on the topic in the Journal of High Energy Physics in 2002. She was the fourth black woman to earn a PhD in theoretical high energy physics.

Career 
After completing her PhD, Dyson joined the University of California, Berkeley and worked as a postdoctoral researcher at the Lawrence Berkeley National Laboratory, Stanford University,  University of California San Francisco, and Princeton University. She worked as a management consultant at Boston Consulting Group between 2004 and 2006, where she helped multi-national companies manage and run their business. She has worked with the chemical, energy, transportation, travel, automotive, packaging, and telecommunications industries.

In 2008 she co-founded Kiverdi with Dr. John Reed, a biotechnology company that uses microbes to turn carbon dioxide and carbon-rich waste, such as wood and agricultural residue, into alternative fuels, protein replacements, oils, and biodegradable materials for applications such as food and agriculture. The technology is based on a space-age technology developed by NASA in the 1960s, where astronauts used microbes called hydrogenotrophs to convert carbon dioxide in exhaled breath into nutrient rich crops. She started to grow the microbes in her lab, working with manufacturers to scale-up their technology. Kiverdi now has over 40 patents granted or pending, and a second company, Air Protein, which was established to focus on sustainable food production. Dyson serves as the CEO of Air Protein.

Media and speaking appearances 
She has delivered several TED talks, including "Turning CO2 into Oil" at TEDxFulbright in May 2014, and "A forgotten Space Age technology could change how we grow food" in July 2016, which has been viewed over one million times. She has spoken about carbon recycling, and appeared on the PBS Nova program Decoding the Weather Machine in April 2018.

Honors and awards 

 In 2012, Kiverdi was awarded the Sustainable Biofuels Award for a "Leader in Bio-based Chemical Industry".
 In 2012, Kiverdi was also awarded a $750,000 grant from the California Energy Commission's Research, Demonstration, and Development program for its "efforts to develop beneficial uses of carbon dioxide" and was selected through competitive peer-review as an industrial user at the U.S. Department of Energy's Molecular Foundry.
 2013 Named to San Francisco Business Times "40 Under 40" 
 In 2014, Dyson was awarded an Entrepreneurship Award from the U.S. Clean Energy Education & Empowerment (C3E) Initiative Award. 
 Named one of the Most Creative People in Business in 2017 by Fast Company
 Named San Francisco Business Times “One of the Most Influential Women in the Bay Area” in 2015 and 2016
 Inducted into San Francisco Business Times Forever Influential Honor Roll
 2018 Women in Natural Sciences Award, "which honors an outstanding female innovator in the STEM field, whose visionary contributions in science have made a positive impact on the world."

External links 

 Patent: Industrial fatty acid engineering general system for modifying fatty acids. United States patent US20130089899A1. https://patents.google.com/patent/US20130089899A1/en
 Patent: Engineered CO2-Fixing Chemotrophic Microorganisms Producing Carbon-Based Products and Methods of Using the Same. United States patent US20150017694A1. https://patents.google.com/patent/US20150017694A1/en

References 

Living people
American technology chief executives
Brandeis University alumni
Alumni of Imperial College London
Theoretical physicists
1974 births
MIT Department of Physics alumni
MIT Center for Theoretical Physics alumni
African-American scientists
American women physicists
American women chief executives
African-American physicists